Citibank Europe plc, commonly known as Citibank, with its headquarters based in the Republic of Ireland, is a subsidiary of Citigroup, a multinational financial services corporation headquartered in New York City, United States. Citibank Europe is connected by a network spanning 98 markets across the world. The U.K. is the headquarters of Citi's Europe, the Middle East and Africa (EMEA) region, which consists of operations in 54 countries.

History
Operations started in Ireland in 1965.

Branches
Citibank Europe has registered offices in Ireland and England with one branch at Citigroup Centre, London, Canary Wharf and the other in Dublin.

Products and services
Citibank Europe offers consumers and institutions a range of financial products and services, including consumer banking and investment banking; institutional equity research and sales; foreign exchange, commercial banking; and treasury and trade solutions and wealth management.

See also

List of banks in Europe

References

External links
Citibank Europe website

Citigroup
Banks of the United Kingdom